Wyndham House is a large stone building on the southeast corner of Sloane Square, Chelsea, London. Wyndham House was formerly the London residence of the prominent Wyndham family. It was owned by the Barons Leconfield. It has since been converted to upscale flats for sale.

References

Wyndham family residences
Grade II listed buildings in the Royal Borough of Kensington and Chelsea